This is a list of things named after Hermann Minkowski (1864 - 1909), German mathematician:

Mathematics

 Brunn–Minkowski theorem
 Hasse–Minkowski theorem
 Hermite–Minkowski theorem
 Minkowski addition
 Minkowski content
 Minkowski distance
 Minkowski functional
 Minkowski inequality
 Minkowski model
 Minkowski plane
 Minkowski problem
 Minkowski problem for polytopes
 Minkowski sausage
 Minkowski island
 Minkowski snowflake
 Minkowski space (number field)
 Minkowski's bound
 Minkowski's first inequality for convex bodies
 Minkowski's question mark function
 Minkowski's second theorem
 Minkowski's theorem in geometry of numbers
 Minkowski–Bouligand dimension
 Minkowski cover
 Minkowski–Hlawka theorem
 Minkowski–Steiner formula
 Smith–Minkowski–Siegel mass formula
 M-matrices

Physics
Abraham–Minkowski controversy
 Minkowski diagram
 Minkowski space
Minkowski superspace

Other
  Minkowski (crater)
 The main-belt asteroid 12493 Minkowski
 The character George Minkowski, from Lost.
 The character Renéee Minkowski, from sci-fi audiodrama podcast Wolf 359.

References

Minkowski